Harold Craig Reynolds (born November 26, 1960) is an American former professional baseball player and current television sports commentator. He also played for the Baltimore Orioles and the California Angels. In 1991, Reynolds was named the recipient of the prestigious Roberto Clemente Award. After his playing career, he became a four-time Emmy Award winning television baseball analyst, working for the MLB Network and Fox Sports.

Early career

High school
Born in Eugene, Oregon, Reynolds was raised in Corvallis and starred in football, basketball, and baseball at Corvallis High School. He was a member of the state championship (AAA) football team in 1978, graduated in 1979, and was inducted into the Oregon Sports Hall of Fame in 1998. He was a member of Corvallis' American Legion baseball team that won state and regional titles in August 1978.

College
Although Reynolds was selected in the 6th round of the 1979 MLB draft by the San Diego Padres on June 5, he opted not to sign and attended college initially at San Diego State University before transferring to Cañada College in Redwood City, California. In the 1980 MLB draft on June 3, Reynolds was selected in the 1st round (2nd pick) of the amateur draft (Secondary Phase) by the Seattle Mariners.

On June 1, 2013, Reynolds was inducted into the Cañada College Hall of Fame and was presented with the "Colts Lifetime Achievement Award".

Professional career
Reynolds spent several seasons in the minor leagues, playing for the Wausau Timbers (A) in Wisconsin in 1981, Lynn Sailors (AA) in Massachusetts in 1982, and Salt Lake Gulls (AAA) in Utah in 1983, prior to his major league debut on September 2, 1983. During his time in the minors, Reynolds learned how to switch hit by working with minor league manager and former Cincinnati Reds catcher Bill Plummer. The following season, he played AAA ball in Salt Lake before being called up again in September 1984. The 1985 season was his official rookie season in Major League Baseball when he played for the Seattle Mariners.

He was the only player other than Rickey Henderson to lead the American League in stolen bases during any season in the 1980s. On defense, Reynolds won three Gold Glove Awards and led the American League in assists and double plays five times each. In 1986, he played in Puerto Rico with the Mayagüez Indians.

On September 30, 1990, Reynolds was the last man to bat at Comiskey Park.

In 1991, Reynolds won the Roberto Clemente Award, given annually to a Major League Baseball player selected for his character and charitable contributions to his community.

On Oct. 26, 1992, Reynolds was granted free agency and signed with the Baltimore Orioles that December. After one season with the Orioles, he again entered free agency on Oct. 29, 1993. Reynolds signed with the San Diego Padres on Jan. 28, 1994, before being traded to the California Angels that March for Hilly Hathaway. The 1994 season was Reynolds' final season in the major leagues.

Reynolds led the league in double plays turned by a second baseman five times and in errors committed by a second baseman four times, and won three Gold Glove awards for his play at second base.

Broadcasting

Reynolds joined ESPN in 1996 as a lead studio analyst on Baseball Tonight. He appeared at major baseball events on the ESPN set including the All-Star Game and the World Series. He also was a commentator for ESPN's coverage of the College World Series and Little League World Series. However, he was fired from the network in July 2006 following accusations of sexual harassment.  Reynolds called the incident "a total misunderstanding" and that a hug he had given a woman had been misinterpreted. Reynolds filed a $5 million lawsuit against ESPN for payment of the remainder of his contract. ESPN settled the case with Reynolds in April 2008, and paid him a seven-figure sum.

Reynolds joined MLB.com as a commentator in June 2007. In April 2008, he joined Mets pre-game and post-game coverage on SportsNet New York as a baseball commentator. Reynolds also worked with TBS on their Sunday baseball telecasts, as well as the 2008 MLB Playoffs.

Reynolds has been an analyst on MLB Network since its launch in January 2009. Reynolds regularly appears on MLB Tonight, Quick Pitch, Diamond Demo and MLB Network's breaking news and special event coverage, including the All-Star Game, Postseason and World Series. He was nominated for a Sports Emmy Award for his work as a studio analyst on MLB Network in 2011, 2012 and 2013.

Reynolds became a member of the MLB on Fox pregame show in 2012, which at the time was being produced out of MLB Network's studios. Reynolds worked on Fox's pregame show for two years alongside Matt Vasgersian and Kevin Millar. After the 2013 season, Reynolds, along with Tom Verducci, was promoted to join Joe Buck on the network's top broadcast team following the retirement of lead analyst Tim McCarver, which lasted for two seasons until they were replaced by John Smoltz in 2016.

During the offseason, Reynolds co hosts the daily morning show Hot Stove with Vasgersian.

Personal life
Reynolds is a Christian and
is the youngest of eight children. His brother Don Reynolds is a former outfielder who played parts of two seasons with the San Diego Padres.

See also
List of Major League Baseball annual stolen base leaders
List of Major League Baseball annual triples leaders

References

External links
Official website

1960 births
Living people
African-American baseball players
American expatriate baseball players in Canada
American League All-Stars
American League stolen base champions
Baltimore Orioles players
Baseball players from Oregon
Calgary Cannons players
California Angels players
Cañada Colts baseball players
Corvallis High School (Oregon) alumni
Gold Glove Award winners
Long Beach State Dirtbags baseball players
Lynn Sailors players
Major League Baseball second basemen
MLB Network personalities
New York Mets announcers
Omaha Royals players
Salt Lake City Gulls players
Seattle Mariners players
Sportspeople from Corvallis, Oregon
Sportspeople from Eugene, Oregon
Wausau Timbers players
21st-century African-American people
20th-century African-American sportspeople
Alaska Goldpanners of Fairbanks players